Turlupin can mean:
 The turlupins, a 14th- and 15th-century French religious sect
 Turlupin (actor), late 16th- and early 17th-century French actor